Eastnor Castle, Eastnor, Herefordshire, is a 19th-century mock castle. Eastnor was built for John Cocks, 1st Earl Somers, who employed Robert Smirke, later the main architect of the British Museum. The castle was built between 1811 and 1820. Major schemes of interior decoration were carried out by A.W.N. Pugin in 1849–1850. Eastnor remains a private home, and is currently the residence of James Hervey-Bathurst, the grandson of Arthur Somers-Cocks, 6th Baron Somers. It is a Grade I listed building. The surrounding gardens and parkland are designated Grade II*. The castle is open to tours by the public on certain months of the year; it is also a wedding venue.

History
The estate was established in the late 16th century when the Cocks family purchased land in the area. Subsequent marriages into the Somers and Nash families helped provide the wealth and substance necessary to build the present imposing building, designed to look like one of the medieval castles guarding the Welsh borders.

The castle was built to the designs of Robert Smirke in 1812–20. A.W.N. Pugin made some internal alterations – including the decoration of the Gothic drawing room – in 1849–50, and George E. Fox made further changes in the 1860s. It is constructed of ashlar stonework, with a lead and slate roof concealed behind an embattled parapet. Cast-iron was used for the roof trusses and floor beams. It was constructed at a cost of £85,000,  the equivalent of approximately £26 million to £28 million at 2007 prices.

The castle was criticised by Charles Locke Eastlake later in the 19th century: 
It is a massive and gloomy-looking building, flanked by watch-towers, and enclosing a keep. To preserve the character at which it aimed, the windows were made exceedingly small and narrow. This must have resulted in much inconvenience within...The building in question might have made a tolerable fort before the invention of gunpowder, but as a residence it was a picturesque mistake.

Recent history
The castle still has an operating flour mill, "one of the oldest in the county", built in the 18th century as Clencher's. In the 21st century, the water supply was "reinstated and the machinery overhauled so it is now workable". As of 2020, the family occupied only a small part of the castle, "smaller rooms, and we mostly live in the kitchen, which was enlarged in 1992", according to James Hervey-Bathurst, who inherited the property from his mother, the Hon. Mrs Elizabeth Hervey-Bathurst, in 1988.

The castle's business was affected for some time in 2020 due to the COVID-19 pandemic but by mid-July 2020, restrictions were easing. The ironwork bridge over the weir, first installed in 1828, was reopened after restoration in 2021.

Media appearances and events

The car manufacturer, Land Rover, uses the Eastnor estate as a venue for potential customers to drive their vehicles; a fee is charged for those participating in the Landrover Experience. The castle has been used as a set location for films, television programmes and music videos including; One More Time, starring Peter Lawford and Sammy Davis, Jr, Slade's video "Run Runaway", the 1986 film adaptation of Oscar Wilde's The Canterville Ghost, the BBC TV adaptation of Little Lord Fauntleroy in 1995, the American reality competition television program, The Amazing Race, ITV's 2015 adaptation of Doctor Thorne, and two episodes of HBO's Succession. Details of the castle's construction were revealed in episode 6 of the 2004 BBC TV series Fred Dibnah's Made in Britain.

Many other films and TV episodes have done filming of some scenes at the castle.

The castle was featured on an episode of An American Aristocrat's Guide to Great Estates on the Smithsonian Channel and Amazon Prime Video. It first aired in 2020.

Citations

Sources

External links

Eastnor Castle - Wedding venue and corporate entertainment centre.
Photos of Eastnor at Flickr

Castles in Herefordshire
Country houses in Herefordshire
Gardens in Herefordshire
Gothic Revival architecture in Herefordshire
Houses completed in 1820
Grade I listed buildings in Herefordshire
Mock castles in England
Historic house museums in Herefordshire